Taučiūnai (formerly) is a village in Kėdainiai district municipality, in Kaunas County, in central Lithuania. According to the 2011 census, the village had a population of 60 people. There is a monument for the first Lithuanian volunteer soldier Povilas Lukšys, who died nearby Taučiūnai in 1919.

History
Taučiūnai has been known since 1375. There was a manor till the mid-20th century. The Taučiūnai folwark belonged to the Medekšos and the Vyšniauskai families.

Demography

References

Villages in Kaunas County
Kėdainiai District Municipality